Xanthoparmelia klauskalbii is a species of foliose lichen in the family Parmeliaceae. Found in Australia, it was described as a new species in 2007 by John Alan Elix. It grows on weathered volcanic rocks. The specific epithet honours German lichenologist Klaus Kalb.

See also
List of Xanthoparmelia species

References

klauskalbii
Lichen species
Lichens described in 2007
Lichens of Australia
Taxa named by John Alan Elix